Rossopomodoro is an Italian pizza restaurant chain, headquartered in Naples, with outlets in Italy, the UK, France, Germany, Iceland, Turkey, Denmark, the US, Saudi Arabia, Japan, Brazil and Malta.

They were founded by three former professional rugby players, and have about 70 outlets in Italy, and expanded into the UK in 2006.

They have ten outlets in the UK, as of June 2016, seven of which are in London.

They have an outlet on Greenwich Avenue in New York City.

In March 2018 Sebeto, Rossopomodoro's parent company, was acquired by OpCapita from Change Capital, both London-based private equity firms, for an undisclosed price.

References

External links
 

Italian companies established in 1997
Pizza chains of the United Kingdom
Pizza franchises
Restaurants established in 1997
Restaurant chains in the United Kingdom